Sartaj Mera Tu Raaj Mera was a 2015 Pakistani soap series. Written by Jahanzeb Qamar it was directed by Shafqat Mohuddin and produced by Syed Mukhtar Ahmed. It features assemble cast Zhalay Sarhadi, Shagufta Ejaz, Ismat Zaidi, Nausheen Shah and Sohail Sameer.

Plot
A soap that entails the story of a joint family. The family is headed by a woman, mother of two sons, played by Shagufta Ejaz. She believes in following traditions and values of her home religiously. She holds complete authority over her sons and their wives. However, this leads to confrontations from time to time.

Cast
 Asad Siddiqui as Shehroze
 Zhalay Sarhadi as Neelam	
 Shagufta Ejaz
 Ismat Zaidi 
 Nausheen Shah as Shehla	
 Sohail Sameer
 Rubina Arif as Sumaila	
 Uroosa Qureshi
 Sara Umair

Broadcast
The show was rebroadcast on Hum Sitaray. It aired in UK on Hum Masala Europe in December 2018. It was dubbed in Pashto and is currently airing on Hum Pashto 1.

Awards and nominations

 Won: Hum Award for Best Soap Actor -  Sohail Smaeer 
 Nominates: Hum Award for Best Soap Actress - Uroosa Qureshi and Nausheen Shah

References

External links
 Official Hum Tv Website

Hum TV original programming
Urdu-language television shows
Pakistani drama television series
2015 Pakistani television series debuts
2014 Pakistani television series endings